Quiacaua is a genus of beetles in the family Cerambycidae, containing the following species:

 Quiacaua abacta (Martins, 1981)
 Quiacaua taguaiba Martins, 1997
Quiacaua vespertina (Monné & Martins, 1973)

References

Eburiini